The Fury is a fictional android character appearing in American comic books published by Marvel Comics, initially in the UK and later in the US. The character is usually depicted as an adversary of Captain Britain and the X-Men.  The character was created by writer Alan Moore and artist Alan Davis, and first appeared in Marvel Super-Heroes #387 (July 1982).

Fictional character biography
The Fury is a deadly "cybiote" (cybernetic symbiote?) built by the reality-manipulating psychic Mad Jim Jaspers of the parallel timeline of Earth-238 and programmed to destroy all superhumans but himself. It is immensely powerful, capable of generating lethal energy blasts and of adapting and regenerating its mechanical body. Like most of Jim Jaspers' other homicidal agents, the Fury was named for a minor character in Alice's Adventures in Wonderland:

The Fury slew all of Earth-238's superheroes, with the exception of Captain UK, who fled to another world at the moment that the Fury killed her husband Rick. Most of the Fury's victims on Earth-238 were based on British comic book characters from the 1950s-1970s. After succeeding in its mission, the Fury was deactivated until Captain Britain and his elflike sidekick Jackdaw were sent to Earth-238 by the Captain's mythic mentor Merlyn. Jaspers had his agents, the Status Crew, reactivate the Fury and send it to kill the hero. The Fury murdered Jackdaw, and then killed Captain Britain himself.

The Captain was retrieved by Merlyn and revived in the alien magician's home dimension, Otherworld. The Fury detected that its prey again lived, and began to adapt itself to interdimensional travel in order to hunt him down. Meanwhile, the temporal overseer Mandragon destroyed Earth-238 in order to kill Jaspers; the Fury barely escaped to Captain Britain's native world, Earth-616.  There, the Fury killed several more of Captain Britain's allies, growing ever more powerful as it did so.  Tracking Captain Britain and disabling him, it finally confronted Earth-616's counterpart of Mad Jim Jaspers, who was beginning to organize a program against his own world's superhumans. The Fury determined that this Jaspers was not its creator and therefore was not exempt from its directive to kill superhumans. The two fought on equal footing, but the Fury won when it transported the pair to the empty void that had been Earth-238. Jaspers was unable to use his powers of reality manipulation in a universe where reality had been destroyed, and the Fury swiftly incinerated his brain. The weakened Fury returned to Earth-616, where it was ambushed and destroyed by Captain Britain and Captain UK, sustaining more damage in the process than it could regenerate.

The Fury preyed on Captain Britain's mind and thus was used by the insane Orpington-Smythe, leader of the R.C.X. He had one of his super-powered agents cast an illusion of Captain Britain's lover Meggan, making her look like the Fury. The Captain instantly struck her down, though she survives with minor injuries.

The Fury reappeared years later in several issues of The Uncanny X-Men that were written by Captain Britain co-creator Chris Claremont and illustrated by Fury co-creator Alan Davis. The Fury, which was later revealed to be a facsimile created by Captain Britain's brother Jamie Braddock, destroys Captain Britain's home and beat the visiting X-Men unconscious. It takes control of X-Men member Sage, who possesses a "computer brain", and has her attack her teammates, but its control over her is severed by an electrical field created by Storm. The Fury is again destroyed when Rachel Summers creates an artificial black hole inside its body, collapsing it into a singularity.

In The Uncanny X-Men #462, Mad Jim Jaspers is resurrected in Otherworld and appears to have merged with the Fury. This leads into the miniseries X-Men: Die by the Sword, in which Jaspers begins transforming the Captain Britain Corps members into Fury. This results in most of the Corps being slain. In the conclusion of this series Fury takes complete control of Jaspers before being defeated and destroyed.

A small remnant of Fury is shown binding with an unknowing Merlyn. He later discovered it, extracted it, and used it as part of a spell to resurrect a fallen Captain Britain.

Powers and abilities
The Fury is described as "the supreme killing machine", and was created via a combination of reality warping and technology, granting it the ability to adapt to anything and everything without limit, making it near-invincible. Its left arm fires energy blasts that are potent enough to kill literally every superhero in its original reality. The Fury can also fire poisonous, barbed darts. The Fury carries detailed files on all known superhumans, and its sophisticated array of sensors is powerful enough to recognize when it has killed all superhumans present in the universe. It has a back-up brain in its spine, should its main brain be disabled.

The Fury has superhuman physical abilities and is virtually indestructible. If damaged, it has self-repair systems, and is capable of developing new powers to deal with unexpected situations. The Fury develops limited teleportation abilities, and when it continues to track the resurrected Captain Britain across realities, it acquires the ability to cross dimensions. Trans-dimensional travel nearly destroys the Fury, and it usually needs to acquire raw "genetic material" to rebuild itself. It is most vulnerable to being destroyed at this time, as its strength, invulnerability and energy blasts are compromised.  The Fury can kill regular humans and use their bodies for this purpose, although killing non-superhumans appears to not be a primary function of the Fury.

The Fury's dart weapons are tipped with a powerful sedative and mutagenic. The Fury kills a host body with its attached barb and drags the body closer to itself. Sid, a hapless drifter, managed to escape the Fury shortly after it warped to Captain Britain's dimension, but he was grazed by one of the Fury's darts. The powerful toxin turns him into a monster that terrorizes London until Captain Britain and the British Army kill him.

The Fury can use any other resources around to rebuild and improve itself. It absorbs most of the 'Mastermind' computer at Braddock Manor, giving it vastly improved computational abilities.

Other versions
Spectacular Spider-Man Adventures, a monthly comic based on the 1990s Spider-Man cartoon and published by Panini Comics in the UK, featured the Fury in #133 (April 2006). The creature emerged in Scotland and battles both Captain Britain & Spider-Man; Captain Britain eventually sacrificed himself to stop it by trapping them both in another reality.

In 2009, Marvel Heroes #15-16 featured the return of the Fury. In #15, Captain Britain returned to Earth with a warning that the Fury was coming back: repeated simulations by a Panini equivalent of the  Illuminati ran hundreds of combat simulations, finding that in each one the Fury would slaughter them. The Silver Surfer offered a solution: making a deal with Galactus to gain the reality-altering Ultimate Nullifier. In #16, the Surfer and Captain Britain successfully gained the weapon, as even Galactus himself won't stand a chance against the Fury. Back on Earth, the cybiote made its appearance in Scotland and began heading south. The next five pages saw the Fury slaughtering every super-team that attempted to stop it: MI-13's British heroes at Dumfries, the X-Men at Manchester, the Avengers and Hulk at Birmingham, the New Warriors, the Defenders, Alpha Flight at Northampton, and a supervillain army at a motorway (the last panel of this had Doctor Doom announcing "Enough! I am Doom, and will destroy-" before he was shot in the face). Finally, the Fantastic Four and their allies fought the monster in central London and were wiped out. At this, the last few heroes and the survivors of the previous battles united under the S.H.I.E.L.D. Helicarrier for a last stand. However, Captain Britain and the Silver Surfer arrived in time, and Captain Britain (with the magical and psychic support of every other hero) fired the Nullifier at close range. The Fury was erased from existence, and reality was reset: all those killed lived again, and there was no memory of the Fury's rampage except for the Watcher's.

Collections
The Fury's appearances have been collected into a number of trade paperback:

 Captain Britain (by Alan Moore and Alan Davis, collects Marvel Super-Heroes #386-388, The Daredevils #1-11, & The Mighty World of Marvel #7-13, 1982–1984, 208 pages, Marvel Comics/Marvel UK, 2002)
 Uncanny X-Men: The New Age, Volume 1: The End Of History (collects The Uncanny X-Men #444-449, 144 pages, Marvel Comics, December 2004)
 X-Men: Die By The Sword (128 pages, Marvel Comics, April 2008)

References

External links
 
 The Fury at the International Catalogue of Superheroes
 
 

Characters created by Alan Davis
Characters created by Alan Moore
Comics characters introduced in 1982
Fictional characters with energy-manipulation abilities
Fictional mass murderers
Marvel Comics characters who can teleport
Marvel Comics characters with accelerated healing
Marvel Comics characters with superhuman strength
Marvel Comics robots
Marvel Comics supervillains
Marvel UK characters